Hunley is a surname.

Hunley may also refer to:

Ships
 , a U.S. Navy ship name
 , a Confederate States of America navy ship name
 H. L. Hunley (submarine), a submarine in Confederate service which was the first submarine to successfully sink a ship
 Hunley-class submarine tender, of the U.S. Navy

Other uses
 Alan Hunley, a fictional character from the 2018 film Mission: Impossible – Fallout
 The Hunley, a 1999 telefilm about the American Civil War submarine Hunley

See also

 
 
 Hundley (surname)
 Huntley (disambiguation)